Miguel da Cunha Arraiolos (born 12 July 1988) is a Portuguese triathlete. He competed in the men's event at the 2016 Summer Olympics.

References

External links
 

1988 births
Living people
Portuguese male triathletes
Olympic triathletes of Portugal
Triathletes at the 2016 Summer Olympics
S.L. Benfica (triathlon)
People from Santarém, Portugal
Sportspeople from Santarém District